Galder is a village in the Dutch province of North Brabant. It is located in the municipality of Alphen-Chaam 8 km south of the city of Breda.

History 
The village was first mentioned in 1299 as Galre. It is possibly a name of a stream. Galder started as a hamlet in a valley near a brook.

The Saint Jacob's Chapel was built in 1468. The tower probably dates from 1517. In 1824, it was converted into a school and the tower and ceiling were lowered. In 1882, it was recommissioned as a church.

Galder was home to 301 people in 1840.

The  is a heath near the village. About  are owned by the Ministry of Defence and sometimes used as a shooting range. There is a nature bath and a recreational area on nature area.

Gallery

References

External links

Populated places in North Brabant
Alphen-Chaam